Conjuring is a 1896 French short silent film directed by Georges Méliès.

Production and release
The film reproduces a magic act Méliès performed at his Paris theater-of-illusions, the Théâtre Robert-Houdin.

Conjuring is notable as Méliès's second film, and as his first to move beyond the actuality film genre pioneered by the Lumière brothers and experiment with using the camera to capture a theatrical magic act. (Later in 1896, with his discovery of the substitution splice technique, Méliès was able to begin augmenting his theatrical illusions with new special effects unique to film.) Conjuring can thus be seen as Méliès's first foray into the world of fiction film.

The film was released by Méliès's Star Film Company and numbered 2 in its catalogues.

Rediscovery

In 2014, the Cinémathèque française received a donation from the collector François Binétruy: a short fragment of chromolithographed animated film, rotoscoped from an unidentified 1896 Méliès film and showing Méliès himself performing a conjuring trick. Such fragments of animation had been manufactured from 1897 onward in Germany and France, for home use in toy projectors.

In 2015, the Cinémathèque uncovered another fragmentary home-projector version of the same film, this time reproducing the original black-and-white live-action frames. In July 2015, the film scholar Jacques Malthête identified the film as Georges Méliès's Conjuring.

References

External links
 
 

1896 films
1890s French films
French silent short films
French black-and-white films
Films directed by Georges Méliès
1890s rediscovered films
Films about magic and magicians
Rediscovered French films
1896 short films